Yaroslav Ivanovych Rushchyshyn (born 29 October 1967) is a Ukrainian businessman and politician currently serving as a People's Deputy of Ukraine from Ukraine's 117th electoral district since 29 August 2019. Beforehand, he was an active contributor to the local culture of the city of Lviv, and one of the student organisers of the 1990 Revolution on Granite.

Early life and career 
Yaroslav Ivanovych Rushchyshyn was born on 29 October 1967 in the city of Lviv, then in the Ukrainian Soviet Socialist Republic within the Soviet Union. He has graduated from the Lviv University of Trade and Economics with a major in accounting, from the National University of Kyiv-Mohyla Academy with a MBA, and from Taras Shevchenko National University of Kyiv with a degree in law. He has additionally completed two certificate programmes in philosophy at the Ukrainian Catholic University. In addition to his native Ukrainian, he is fluent in English, Polish, and French, and is learning German.

Rushchyshyn helped to organise protests by students at the Lviv University of Trade and Economics on 2 October 1990, as well as a student hunger strike, thus beginning the Revolution on Granite.

Cultural and business activities 
Prior to and following the Revolution on Granite, Rushchyshyn began undertaking activities to benefit Ukraine's culture, including helping to organise the  festivals in 1990 and 1992. Rushchyshyn, as well as fellow student leader  worked as a producer for Ukrainian musicians throughout the 1990s, including Dead Rooster, Ruslana, and Okean Elzy. In 1993, together with several other fellow students and local artists, Rushchyshyn helped found the Dzyga Art Center.

Rushchyshyn has also been active in the Ukrainian Greek Catholic Church, helping to reorganise  following Ukraine's independence. He has been declared an honourary senator at the Ukrainian Catholic University.

Rushchyshyn has compared his ideal vision for Lviv to British cities Oxford and Cambridge, and has called for greater investment into local education and culture. He is owner of Trottola JSC, a network of sewing factories based in Western Ukraine. Along with other entrepreneurs, he protested against the tax authorities in Lviv Oblast, eventually becoming one of the members of the Council of Entrepreneurs in Lviv Oblast.

Lvivska Hazeta 
In 2003, along with Ivashchyshyn, Rushchyshyn became owner of Lviv-based internet news portal . In response, the tax administration accused Ivashchyshyn and Rushchyshyn of money laundering, claiming that Trottola JSC had not been announced as a sponsor of the "Listen to Ukrainian!" festival, a get out the vote measure in the 2002 Ukrainian parliamentary election. The attempt was further alleged by Ukrainian newspaper Dzerkalo Tyzhnia as part of an effort by the Ukrainian government to crush resistance from veterans of the Revolution on Granite, particularly Ivashchyshyn, who had been a leader of anti-government protests such as Ukraine without Kuchma. However, the attempt to charge the two with a crime was ultimately unsuccessful; Ivashchyshyn and Rushchyshyn were found to be innocent.

Political career 
Rushchyshyn was floated as a potential candidate by influential newspaper Ukrainska Pravda in the 2012 Ukrainian parliamentary election as a People's Deputy of Ukraine in Ukraine's 123rd electoral district, with his protests against Medvedchuk being noted. However, he ultimately was not a candidate in the election.

In the 2019 Ukrainian parliamentary election, Rushchyshyn was a candidate for People's Deputy of Ukraine in Ukraine's 117th electoral district, running as a member of Holos. At the time of his election, he was an independent. He was successful, defeating incumbent People's Deputy  with 25.12% of the vote to Yurynets' 23.77%. Following his election, he became secretary of the Verkhovna Rada Economic Development Committee.

Rushchyshyn unsuccessfully ran to be chair of the Lviv City Council, supported by Holos, in 2020.

Rushchyshyn was one of six People's Deputies to vote against ratifying the Istanbul Convention.

References 

1967 births
Living people
Ninth convocation members of the Verkhovna Rada
Members of the Ukrainian Greek Catholic Church
People of the Revolution on Granite
Politicians from Lviv
Voice (Ukrainian political party) politicians